Cryptic Collection 4 (abbreviated as CC4) is the sixth compilation album of Cryptic Collection series by American hip hop duo Twiztid. Released on September 13, 2011 through Psychopathic Records, a follow-up to 2009's Cryptic Collection: Holiday Edition, it served as a sequel to CC3 (2004). Among Twiztid's, production was handled by Eric Davie, Michael "Seven" Summers, Mike E. Clark, Fritz "The Cat" Van Kosky and Stircrazy. It features guest appearances from House of Krazees, Insane Clown Posse, Prozak, Anybody Killa, Boondox, E-40, Krizz Kaliko and Tech N9ne.

The album peaked at #108 on the Billboard 200, at #13 on the Top Rap Albums and at #17 on the Independent Albums in the United States.

Track listing

Notes
Tracks 1 and 2 were recorded in 2003 and performed by characters of Big Stank (portrayed by Jamie Madrox) and Lil' Poot (portrayed by Monoxide) from John Cafiero's 2001 film Big Money Hustlas (2003)
Tracks 3 and 16 appeared on Psychopathics From Outer Space Vol. 3 (2007)
Track 4 appeared on the limited edition Fright Fest 2005 EP (2005)
Track 5 appeared on Twiztid's album The Green Book (2003)
Tracks 6 and 11 were tracks made specifically for the compilation (2011)
Tracks 7, 9, and 14 appeared on the tour exclusive End of Days EP (2009)
Tracks 8 and 13 appeared on the tour exclusive Toxic Terror EP (2008)
Track 10 appeared on Psychopathics From Outer Space Vol. 2 (2003)
Track 12 appeared on the limited edition Fright Fest 2003 EP (2003)
Track 15 was a Twiztid song which was released as a single at New Years Evil 3 (2010)
Track 17 was an outtake from Twiztid's album Independents Day (2007)

Personnel
Jamie "Madrox" Spaniolo – vocals, producer (tracks: 1, 2, 15, 17)
Paul "Monoxide" Methric – vocals, producer (tracks: 1, 2, 5, 12, 15, 17)
Steven T. Shippy – vocals (tracks: 4, 11)
Aaron Dontez Yates – vocals (track 4)
Samuel William Christopher Watson IV – vocals (track 4)
Earl T. Stevens – vocals (track 5)
Joseph Bruce – vocals (tracks: 6, 14)
Joseph Utsler – vocals (track 6)
Bryan Jones – vocals (tracks: 8, 12)
David Hutto – vocals (track 9)
James Lowery – vocals (track 12)
Eric Davie – producer (tracks: 1, 2, 7-9, 11, 15, 17)
Mike E. Clark – producer (tracks: 3, 4)
Michael "Seven" Summers – producer (tracks: 6, 14, 16)
Fritz Vankosky – producer (track 10)
Stircrazy – producer (track 13)
Jim Neve – artwork

Charts

References

Sequel albums
2011 compilation albums
Twiztid compilation albums
Albums produced by Mike E. Clark
Psychopathic Records compilation albums
Albums produced by Seven (record producer)